Sunehri Kothi (Mansion of Gold) is a magnificent hall in the city of Tonk in the Indian state  of Rajasthan.

The hall is within the old palace complex, whose walls and ceilings are one sumptuous expanse of enamel mirror-work, gilt and painted glass illuminated through stained-glass windows from Belgium. The entire effect is that of an exquisite piece of enamel jewellery blown up to the size  of a hall.

It was built by Nawab Mohammed Ibrahim Ali Khan (1867-1930), the Nawab of Tonk, for poetry recitals, dance and music.

Tourist attractions in Tonk district
Buildings and structures in Rajasthan